Jindal Vijaynagar Airport  is a regional airport serving Toranagallu, Karnataka. Because of its location near Vidyanagar Township, the airport is also known as Vidyanagar Airport. It is owned and operated by JSW Steel, which operates a steel mill in Toranagallu. The name Jindal Vijaynagar comes from the company Jindal Vijaynagar Steel Ltd (JVSL), which merged to form JSW Steel in 2005.

Formerly a private landing strip for JVSL employees, the airport was upgraded to receive its first commercial flights in December 2006, serving tourism and business interests in Bellary District. Regional airline TruJet started providing daily flight services from Hyderabad and Bengaluru. Later, the operations were indefinitely suspended. Passenger services has resumed again by Alliance Air from the airport to Bengaluru and Hyderabad from 30 October 2022.

History
Jindal Vijaynagar Airport was originally a private airstrip used by Jindal Vijaynagar Steel to transport senior employees to and from its adjacent steel plant. In 2004, the Government of Karnataka agreed to allow commercial flights from the airstrip. The airport is located close to the tourist attractions of Hampi, and the State Government hoped it attract businessmen to the steel industry in Bellary. Bellary Airport was not used as its runway was too short and narrow, and there was no room to expand it. Air Deccan announced it would commence flights from Bengaluru on 2 October 2004; however, the route was not launched because of technical reasons.

The State Government still required certain facilities to be installed at the airstrip, including additional navigational aids and an air traffic control tower. JSW Steel began construction on a  passenger terminal in 2006. The airport was inaugurated on 3 November 2005 with Sajjan Jindal, managing director of JSW Steel, and several members of the State Government, including Governor T. N. Chaturvedi, in attendance. Air Deccan conducted an inaugural flight to the airport on that day but did not begin routine operations until 1 December. The airline initially operated daily flights to Bangalore and Goa. Air Deccan merged with Kingfisher Airlines in 2008 to form Kingfisher Red, which ended flights to the airport in early 2009 because of low occupancy. Later, regional carrier TruJet began daily flight services to Hyderabad and Bengaluru. However, in 2018, the services were indefinitely stopped and were not resumed again. As of October 2022, Alliance Air has resumed daily flight services to Hyderabad and Bengaluru from 30 October 2022.

Facilities
Jindal Vijaynagar Airport has one runway, designated 13/31, that measures .

Airlines and destinations

Statistics

See also
 New Bellary airport

References

External links
 

Airports in Karnataka
Buildings and structures in Bellary district
Transport in Bellary district
Airports with year of establishment missing